Gummow is a surname. Notable people with the surname include:

Benjamin Gummow (1766–1840), Welsh architect
William Gummow (born 1942), Australian judge